James "Jay" Chapelhow (born 21 September 1995) is an English professional rugby league footballer who plays as a  for the Newcastle Thunder in the Betfred Championship.

Background
Chapelhow was born in Runcorn, Cheshire, England.

Career

Widnes Vikings
Chapelhow made his senior début on loan at Whitehaven. In total he played four games for the Cumbrian club. His début for parent club Widnes Vikings came in a Super League Super 8s qualifier against Leigh Centurions on 27 September 2015.

Ottawa Aces
On 10 Aug 2020 it was announced that Jay, along with his twin brother Ted, had signed for Ottawa Aces.

Newcastle Thunder
Due to Ottawa Aces' deferred competition start date, Chapelhow, again with his twin brother, both instead signed up for Newcastle Thunder on 24 Dec 2020.

References

External links
Widnes Vikings profile
SL profile

1995 births
Living people
English rugby league players
Newcastle Thunder players
Rugby league players from Widnes
Rugby league props
Whitehaven R.L.F.C. players
Widnes Vikings players